Vogatsiko (Vogatsikó) is a village and a community in northern Greece in the region of Western Macedonia, located at the southeast corner of Kastoria regional unit. Between 1997 and 2010, it was the seat of the municipality of Ion Dragoumis. The population was 549 at the 2011 census. It is surrounded by mountains on three sides and overlooks a valley through which Aliakmon river passes.

According to the statistics of Vasil Kanchov ("Macedonia, Ethnography and Statistics"), 1.750 Greek Christians lived in the village in 1900.

The village has a rich history, including being the origin of the Dragoumis family and its most notable member, Ion Dragoumis.

References

Populated places in Kastoria (regional unit)